Hwang Eun-suk (born 14 April 1973) is a South Korean taekwondo practitioner. 

She won a gold medal in bantamweight at the 1997 World Taekwondo Championships in Hong Kong, by defeating Elisabet Delgado in the semifinal, and Roxane Forget in the final.

References

External links

1973 births
Living people
South Korean female taekwondo practitioners
World Taekwondo Championships medalists